Jean-Michel Tinivelli (born March 19, 1967) is a French actor with Italian roots.

References

Living people
1967 births
French actors